Shreeraj Kurup (Hindi:श्रीराज कुरूप, Malayalam:ശ്രീരാജ് കുറുപ്പ്) is a poet and lyricist  from India. He is known for writing the lyrics of Mujhme Hindi Cover of Malare, Ye Chahte, Pass ho tum, etc.

Early life
Shreeraj was born in New Delhi to Malayali parents Surendran Kurup and Vijay Laxmi. He attended Kerala School, Delhi and holds a Bachelor's Degree in Mechanical Engineering. After completing the graduation course, he started working in Bangalore. He Launched his own YouTube Channel with the name Shreeraj Kurup-Official and started publishing his work. He started off by tweaking lyrics of popular Hindi songs. His cover of hit number Nenjodu Cherthu is also popular on YouTube. He also wrote the Hindi and Malayalam lyrics for Tum hi ho-Multilingual which became a hit on YouTube. But it was the Hindi and Tamil cover of a Malayalam song Malare from the movie Premam which made him popular. Malare Hindi, within few days upon release became popular on social media. The song was published in many leading newspapers all praising his work. His style of writing is always compared to that of Javed Aktar.

References

External links
 
 

1990 births
Living people
Indian male poets
Urdu-language poets
Indian lyricists
Hindi-language writers
Hindi-language lyricists
Hindi-language poets
Indian male songwriters
Poets from Delhi